Carlos de la Vega Díaz (born 24 January 1980) is a Spanish retired footballer who played as a right back.

Football career
After emerging through Rayo Vallecano's youth system, de la Vega went on to play with amateur sides RSD Alcalá and AD Alcorcón, also from his hometown of Madrid, until well into his 20s.

He did not have his first taste of full professional football until the 2008–09 season (he had only played one match with Rayo's first team in 2002–03's La Liga, two minutes) when, after returning to Rayo in the previous year, he was fairly used as the club easily retained its Segunda División status.

In late December 2009, unsettled de la Vega was loaned to another side in the second level, SD Huesca, until the end of the season. In July 2012, after more than one year out of football, the 32-year-old signed for two seasons with CD Leganés of Segunda División B.

Drug scandal
In February 2009, de la Vega was arrested in connection with an anti-drug operation in the Spanish capital. After eight days, he paid €30.000 in order to be released from custody.

Former footballers Predrag Stanković and Txutxi were also involved in the plot, among others. In 2014 (confirmation in 2015) de la Vega was one of two persons acquitted, as five other people received sentences that ranged from four to 12 years.

References

External links

1980 births
Living people
Footballers from Madrid
Spanish footballers
Association football defenders
La Liga players
Segunda División players
Segunda División B players
Tercera División players
Rayo Vallecano B players
Rayo Vallecano players
RSD Alcalá players
AD Alcorcón footballers
SD Huesca footballers
CD Leganés players